7×7 Tales of a Sevensleeper is a 1985 children's book written by Hanna Johansen.

Synopsis 
Much to his brother's and parents' dismay, a boy's obsession over the habits of his favourite animals—squirrel-like creatures called "sevensleepers"—makes him pretend he is one of them.  The number seven figures in his daily routines throughout the course of 49 stories: he becomes that age early on in the book, with as many presents to match; he goes to bed every night at seven o'clock; and he even eats or owns things in groups of seven.  This trait even helps him follow the week more efficiently than months or years, which are both far longer.

Publishing history 
Siebenschläfergeschichten, the original German version of 7×7 Tales of a Sevensleeper, was published in 1985 by the Swiss company Nagel & Kimche.  A Dutch edition, titled De zevenslaper and translated by Erna Borawitz, came out through the Christofoor imprint a year later.  In the Iberian realm, the book was translated into Spanish by Lola Romero (as 1987's Cuentos de lirones), and in Portuguese as Histórias de Sete-Sonos in 1991.  The Penguin subsidiary E. P. Dutton released an English translation for the US market (by Christopher Franceschelli) in 1989; a British version, by Marion Koenig, appeared through Faber and Faber a year later.

Reception 
Colin Mills of Britain's The Guardian noted that "the writer [Johansen] is skilled in pithy observation" throughout the "49 witty, quirky yarns" comprising Tales of a Sevensleeper.  "There is word-play, good natural history," he added, "and the pictures by Kathi Bhend, some cartoon format, some intricate miniatures, are unusually integral."   Another British publication, The School Librarian, said of the book: "Despite an ambiguous opening [...], it is a clever work of imagination".  Carolyn Phelan commented likewise in an issue of Booklist: "While the whimsical prose will strike some readers as too precious, others will find its brand of imagination engaging."  Tatiana Castleton, a Californian librarian, wrote in the School Library Journal that this "unusual and intriguing little book [is] not for everyone, but made to order for lap and read-aloud sessions with the right listener."  She praised Franceschelli's prose as "beautiful", and Bhend's illustrations "endlessly inventive and fascinating."

References 

1985 children's books
Swiss children's novels
German-language novels